HD 56577 is a single K giant or supergiant star in the southern constellation of Canis Major.This star is Gould's 145th of Canis Major in his Uranometria Argentina.  Kostjuk erroneously lists it as simply "145 CMa". SIMBAD follows this error in its object query result as "* 145 CMa – Star".

References

K-type giants
K-type supergiants
Canis Major
Durchmusterung objects
Canis Majoris, 145
056577
035210
2764